"Africa" is a 1982 song recorded by French singer Rose Laurens. It was one of the singles from her first album Déraisonnable and was released in France at the end of 1982. A version with English lyrics, titled "Africa (Voodoo Master)", was released worldwide in March 1983. The version available on the 7" is shorter than on the album, as the musical bridge is shortened and there are fewer refrains. It immediately became a smash hit in many countries, reaching the top of the charts. In 1994, a CD maxi of remixes was released, but failed to chart.

Chart performances
The single was a commercial success, reaching the top one in Austria, and remained for 16 weeks in the top twenty. In Norway, the single charted for 15 weeks in the top ten, including a peak at number two for two weeks. The song appeared for ten weeks in the top 15 in Switzerland, with a peak at number two. In Germany, "Africa" charted for 23 weeks and peaked at number three in its fourth week.

In France, there was no official singles chart then, but it reached Platinum status with a million copies sold.

Track listings
 7" single
 "Africa (Voodoo Master)" — 3:28
 "Broken Heart" — 3:43

 CD maxi - 1994 remixes
 "Africa" (remix '94) (Berlin single radio edit) — 3:21
 "Africa" (remix '94) (Paris single radio edit) — 3:50
 "Africa" (remix '94) (Berlin club mix) — 4:55

 2022 Remixes
 "Africa" (Superfunk Remix) - 2:58
 "Africa" (Luke Mornay Remix) - 3:35
 "Africa" (7th Heaven Remix) - 3:24
 "Africa" (Superfunk Extended Remix) - 5:03
 "Africa" (Luke Mornay Extended Remix) - 7:18
 "Africa" (7th Heaven Extended Remix) - 5:24
 "Africa" - 3:36

Charts and certifications

Weekly charts

Year-end charts

Certifications

References

1982 singles
1983 singles
Rose Laurens songs
Number-one singles in Austria
1982 songs
Warner Music Group singles